Castlebar railway station serves the town of Castlebar in County Mayo, Ireland.

The station is on the Dublin to Westport Rail service. Passengers to or from Galway travel to Athlone and change trains. Passengers to or from Ballina and Foxford travel to Manulla Junction and change trains.

History
The station opened on 17 December 1862,  from  via Mullingar.

References

Sources

External links
Irish Rail Castlebar Station Website

Iarnród Éireann stations in County Mayo
Railway stations in County Mayo
Railway stations opened in 1862
Castlebar
1862 establishments in Ireland
Railway stations in the Republic of Ireland opened in the 19th century